Niobium(IV) fluoride is a chemical compound with the formula . It is a nonvolatile black solid.

Properties 
 absorbs vapor strongly and turns into  in moist air. It reacts with water to form a brown solution and a brown precipitate whose components are unknown. It is stable between 275 °C and 325 °C when heated in a vacuum. However, it disproportionates at 350 °C rapidly to form niobium(V) fluoride and niobium(III) fluoride:

 (at 350 °C)

Structure 
Niobium(IV) fluoride adopts a crystal structure analogous to that of tin(IV) fluoride, in which each niobium atom is surrounded by six fluorine atoms forming an octahedron. Of the six fluorine atoms surrounding a single niobium atom, four are bridging to adjacent octahedra, leading to a structure of octahedra connected in layers.

References 

Niobium(IV) compounds
Fluorides
Metal halides